Nunavut has several species of mammals (ᐱᓱᒃᑎ, pisukti), of which the Inuit found use for almost all. The larger animals such as the caribou would be eaten, with the skin used for tents and clothing and the sinew used for thread. In lean times even animals such as the fox would have been eaten and some people did eat it even when other foods were available. With the arrival of the traders the fox skin became a valuable source for trade, however, traditionally the skin was not often used except as a sanitary napkin. The skins of smaller animals such as the weasel would have been used to provide decoration on clothing.

Some of the animals in this list, such as the lynx, are rarely seen as they live mainly in the very southern part of the territory away from any communities.

There are several different dialects of Inuktitut and Inuinnaqtun as well as two alphabets, Inuktitut syllabics and Latin. The Inuit name or spelling may differ from one region to another and in extreme cases from one community to another.

Artiodactyla (ᑯᑭᑯᖅᑐᔪᑦ)

Bovidae (ᓇᒃᔪᒋᒃᑐᑦ)
Muskox (ᐅᒥᖕᒪᒃ, umingmait, umingmak, oomingmak) Ovibos moschatus 
Cervidae (ᓇᒃᔪᓖᑦ)
Caribou (ᑐᒃᑐ, tuktut) Rangifer tarandus 
Barren-ground caribou (ᓇᐹᕐᑐᕐᑲᓐᖏᑦᑐᒥ ᑐᒃᑐ, tuktut, tuktu) Rangifer tarandus groenlandicus 
Peary caribou (ᕐᑯᑦᓯᑦᑐᒥ ᑐᒃᑐ, tuku, qakuqtakuluit tuktut, qikiqtani tuktuit) Rangifer tarandus pearyi 
Moose Alces alces 
Western moose (ᑐᒃᑐᕙᒃ, tuktuvak) Alces alces andersoni

Carnivora (ᓂᕐᑭᑐᖅᑎᑦ, ᓂᕿᑐᐃᓐᓇᐃᓈᖅ, niqituinnainaaq)

Canidae (ᕐᑭᒻᐅᔭᑦ)
Grey wolf (ᐊᒪᕈᖅ, amaruq) Canis lupus 
Arctic wolf, Canis lupus arctos 
Arctic fox (ᑎᕆᒐᓐᓂᐊᖅ, tiriganniak, tiriqaniaq) Vulpes lagopus 
Red fox (ᑲᔪᖅ, kajuqtuq, kajuit) Vulpes vulpes 
Felidae (ᑯᑭᓕᒑᕐᔪᐃᑦ)
Canada lynx (ᐱᖅᑐᖅᓯᕋᖅ, piqtuqsiraq) Lynx canadensis 
Ursidae (ᓄᑭᓖᑦ)
Black bear (ᐊᒃᖤᒃ, aklaq) Ursus americanus 
Grizzly bear (ᓇᐹᖅᑐᖃᖕᒋᑦᑐᒥ ᐊᒃᖤᒃ, atiqpuq) Ursus arctos horribilis 
Polar bear (ᓇᓄᖅ, nanuq) Ursus maritimus 
Mustelidae (ᑎᕆᐊᓂᙶᖅᑐᑦ)
Wolverine (ᖃᕝᕕᒃ, qalvik, qavvik) Gulo gulo 
River otter (ᑯᒻᒥ ᐸᒥᐅᖅᑑᖅ, pamiuqtuuq) Lontra canadensis 
Beringian ermine (ᑎᕆᐊᖅ, tiriaqpak, tiqiak) Mustela erminea 
American ermine (ᑎᕆᐊᖅ, tiriaqpak, tiqiak) Mustela richardsonii 
Least weasel (ᒥᑭᓂᖅᓴᖅ ᑎᕆᐊᖅ, tiriaq, tiqiak) Mustela nivalis 
American marten (ᖃᑉᕕᐊᕐᓯᐊᖅ, qapviarsiaq) Martes americana 
American mink (ᑎᕆᐊᖅᐸᒃ, tiriaqpak) Neogale vison 
Fisher (ᑎᕆᐊᕐᔪᐊᖅ) Pekania pennanti 
Phocidae (ᓇᑦᓯᖅ, natsiq)
Bearded seal (ᐅᒡᔪᒃ, ᐅᒥᒃᑑᖅ, ugjuk) Erignathus barbatus
Hooded seal (ᓇᑦᓯᕙᒃ, natsivak) Cystophora cristata 
Harbour seal (ᖃᓯᒋᐊᖅ, qasigiaq) Phoca vitulina
Harp seal (ᖃᐃᕈᓕᒃ, qairulik) Pagophilus groenlandicus 
Grey seal (ᐳᕕᓲᖅ, puvisuuq) Halichoerus grypus 
Ringed seal (ᓇᑦᑎᖅ, nattiq) Pusa hispida 
Odobenidae
Walrus (ᐊᐃᕕᖅ, aiviq) Odobenus rosmarus

Lagomorpha (ᑭᖑᓪᓖᖅᑯᖅᑐᔪᑦ)
Leporidae (ᐅᑲᓖᑦ)
Arctic hare (ᐅᑭᐅᖅᑕᖅᑐᒥ ᐅᑲᓕᖅᐸᒃ, ukaliq, okalik, ukalik) Lepus arcticus 
Snowshoe hare (ᑭᖑᓪᓖᕐᑯᕐᑐᔪᖅ ᐅᑲᓕᖅ) Lepus americanus

Rodentia (ᑎᓯᓖᑦ)
Castoridae (ᐸᒥᐅᒥᓅᖅᑐᑦ)
American beaver (ᑭᒋᐊᖅ, kigiaq, kiqiaq) Castor canadensis
Muridae (ᐊᕕᙵᐃᑦ)
Muskrat (ᐊᕕᙵᕐᔪᐊᖅ, kivgaluk, avinnqarjuaq) Ondatra zibethicus
North American brown lemming (ᑲᔪᖅ ᐊᕕᙵᖅ, kayuqtumik avin'ngak, avin'ngaq, avinnqaq) Lemmus trimucronatus
Peary land collared lemming (ᕐᑲᑯᖅᑕᖅ ᐊᕕᙵᖅ, qutulingmik avin'ngak, avin'ngaq, aupajaaqtuq avinnqaq) Dicrostonyx groenlandicus
Meadow vole (ᐊᕕᙵᕋᓛᖅ) Microtus pennsylvanicus
Northern red-backed vole (ᐅᑭᐅᖅᑕᖅᑐᒥ ᐊᐅᐸᖅᑐᒥᒃ ᕐᑯᓖᓕᒃ ᐊᕕᙵᕋᓛᖅ) Myodes rutilus
Brown rat (ulimakka) Rattus norvegicus (introduced)
Sciuridae (ᓯᒃᓯᑦ)
Arctic ground squirrel (ᓯᒃᓯᒃ, siksik) Spermophilus parryii
Red squirrel (ᐊᐅᐸᖅᑐᖅ ᓯᒃᓯᐅᔭᖅ) Tamiasciurus hudsonicus

Insectivora (ᕐᑯᐱᕐᕈᑐᖅᑏᑦ)

Soricidae (ᓂᕇᓐᓇᓲᑦ, utjunaq)
Masked shrew (ᐊᐅᐸᖅᑐᖅ ᓯᒃᓯᐅᔭᖅ, uqjunqnaq) Sorex cinereus

Chiroptera (ᐅᓐᓄᐊᖅᓯᐅᑦ)
Vespertilionidae (ᐃᓴᕈᕐᓗᒃᑐᑦ)
Hoary bat (ᕐᑭᖑᔭᖅ ᑎᒻᒥᓲᖅ ᐊᕕᙵᐅᔭᖅ) Lasiurus cinereus
Little brown myotis (ᒥᑭᔪᖅ ᑲᔪᖅ ᑎᒻᒥᓲᖅ ᐊᕕᙵᐅᔭᖅ) Myotis lucifugus

Cetacea

Balaenidae
Bowhead whale (ᐊᕐᕕᖅ, arviq) Balaena mysticetus
Balaenopteridae
Fin whale, Balaenoptera physalus
Sei whale, Balaenoptera borealis
Blue whale (ᐊᕐᕕᖅ ᓂᐊᖁᕐᓗᖕᓂᖅᓴᖅ, ᐃᐸᒃ, arviq niaqurlungniqsaq, ipak) Balaenoptera musculus
Common minke whale, Balaenoptera acutorostrata
Humpback whale, Megaptera novaeangliae
Delphinidae
Killer whale (ᐋᕐᓗ, ᐊᕐᓗᒃ, ᐋᕐᓗᒃ, aarlu, arluk, aarluk) Orcinus orca
Long-finned pilot whale
White-beaked dolphin
Monodontidae
Narwhal (ᑑᒑᓕᒃ, tuugaalik, ᕿᓚᓗᒐᖅ ᑑᒑᓕᒃ, qilalugaq tuugaalik) Monodon monoceros
Beluga whale (ᕿᓇᓗᒐᖅ, qilalugaq) Delphinapterus leucas
Cumberland Sound beluga
Phocoenidae
Harbour porpoise, Phocoena phocoena
Physeteridae
Sperm whale (ᑭᒍᑎᓕᒃ, kigutilik) Physeter macrocephalus
Ziphiidae
Northern bottlenose whale, Hyperoodon ampullatus

See also
List of birds of Nunavut

References

External links
Wildlife Publications including "Terrestrial Mammals Fact Sheets" from the Government of Nunavut

mammals

Mammals
Nunavut